The Galway Famine Ship Memorial is a memorial located  in  Salthill, County Galway, Ireland. It was unveiled on 4 July 2012. The monument is an expansion of a pre-existing monument to Celia Griffin, a girl who died at age 6 on the streets of Galway.  Flanking the original monument, made of limestone, are two sandstone monuments carved in the shape of ships' sails. Each sail is engraved with the names of 50 ships which carried those escaping the  Great Famine. These ships, sometimes known as coffin ships, were often poorly maintained and allowed for the rapid spread of disease, resulting in many deaths during the voyages.

See also
 List of memorials to the Great Famine
 National Famine Memorial, Murrisk, County Mayo

References 

 

Monuments and memorials in the Republic of Ireland